Hughes and Harlow: Angels in Hell is a 1977 film by director Larry Buchanan. The film is about the relationship between Howard Hughes (played by Victor Holchak) and Jean Harlow (played by Lindsay Bloom).

Cast
 Victor Holchak as Howard Hughes
 Lindsay Bloom as Jean Harlow
 David McLean as Billy
 Charles Aidikoff as Projectionist
 James S. Appleby as Pilot
 Wally K. Berns as Announcer
 James Brodhead as Lawyer
 Don Brodie as Director
 Barry Buchanan as Pilot
 Adele Claire as Mother
 David Clover as George
 Rita Conde as Inez
 Tony Cortez as Emiliano
 Brian Cummings as Assistant Director
 John S. Curran as Chase Cop

References

External links

1977 films
1970s biographical drama films
American biographical drama films
Biographical films about actors
Cultural depictions of Howard Hughes
Films about film directors and producers
Films about filmmaking
Films directed by Larry Buchanan
Films scored by Jimmie Haskell
Films set in 1929
Films set in 1930
1977 drama films
1970s English-language films
1970s American films